Unaspis citri, known generally as citrus snow scale, is a species of armored scale insect in the family Diaspididae. Other common names include the orange chionaspi, orange snow scale, white louse scale, and white snow scale.

References

Further reading

 
 
 
 

Insects described in 1883
Diaspididae